Group A of the 2013 Fed Cup Americas Zone Group I was one of four pools in the Americas zone of the 2013 Fed Cup. Four teams competed in a round robin competition, with the top team and the bottom two teams proceeding to their respective sections of the play-offs: the top teams played for advancement to the World Group II Play-offs, while the bottom teams faced potential relegation to Group II.

Standings

Round-robin

Colombia vs. Venezuela

Canada vs. Peru

Colombia vs. Peru

Canada vs. Venezuela

Colombia vs. Canada

Peru vs. Venezuela

See also 
 Fed Cup structure

References

External links 
 Fed Cup website

2013 Fed Cup Americas Zone